(Where God the Lord stands with us not), 178 is a church cantata by Johann Sebastian Bach. He composed it in Leipzig for the eighth Sunday after Trinity and first performed it on 30 July 1724. It is a chorale cantata from his second annual cycle, based on the hymn "" (1524) by Justus Jonas, a paraphrase of Psalm 124.

History and words 

Bach composed the cantata in his second year in Leipzig for the Eighth Sunday after Trinity. The prescribed readings for the Sunday are from the Epistle to the Romans, "For as many as are led by the Spirit of God, they are the sons of God", and from the Gospel of Matthew, the warning of false prophets from the Sermon on the Mount. The cantata text is based on the hymn "", published in 1524 by the Lutheran reformer Justus Jonas as a paraphrase of Psalm 124. The theme of the psalm, the need of help against raging enemies, corresponds to the Gospel. Compared to Bach's other chorale cantatas of the period, the unknown poet kept much of the original text, six of the eight stanzas, expanding two of them by recitative, to connect even closer to the Gospel. He paraphrased only stanzas 3 and 6 to an aria each. In the last aria, in a statement of opposition to rationalism—the "weasel words of rationalists, who would bring down the whole Lutheran theological edifice" in the words of John Eliot Gardiner—the poet expands the words of the reformers' hymn, "" (reason cannot grasp it), appealing to reason, described as unstable and frenzied, to be silent.

Bach first performed the cantata on 30 July 1724, as the eighth chorale cantata of his second annual cycle.

Johann Nikolaus Forkel borrowed the manuscripts of Bach's chorale cantatas from Bach's son Friedemann and copied two of the cantatas, and this cantata.

Scoring and structure 

The cantata in seven movements is scored for three vocal soloists—alto, tenor and bass—a four-part choir, horn, two oboes, two oboes d'amore, two violins, viola and basso continuo.

 Chorale: 
 Recitative and chorale (alto): 
 Aria (bass): 
 Chorale (tenor): 
 Chorale and recitative (alto, tenor, bass): 
 Aria (tenor): 
 Chorale:

Music 

As in most of Bach's chorale cantatas, the opening chorus is a chorale fantasia. The chorale tune was published in 1529 by an anonymous author in Wittenberg. The soprano sings this chorale melody line by line, doubled by the horn, as a cantus firmus to the independent concerto of the orchestra. The strings play "agitated dotted rhythms", the oboes "agitated semiquaver cascades" throughout the movement, supplying a sense of unity. The lower voices sing partly in homophony, partly in independent movement similar to the instruments. Bach uses the contrast to illustrate the text in the first lines, with no regard to its negation. "" is set in homophony and the last word "" (literally: "holds") is held as a long note, whereas in "" the raging of the enemies is shown in dotted rhythm and fast runs. When the bar form's  is repeated in the following lines, Bach repeats the music also, although it doesn't reflect the text.

In the following chorale and recitative, Bach distinguishes the chorale lines from the secco recitative by a continuo line on a repeated motif that is derived from the beginning of the respective melody line, termed "in rhythmically compressed form ... four times as fast".

The first aria shows the image of "wild sea surf" in undulating movements in the voice, in the obbligato part of the violins in unison, and in the continuo. The bass voice has to sing challenging coloraturas on the words "" and especially "" (be wrecked).

The center of the cantata is an unchanged stanza of the chorale, the alto's unadorned melody accompanied by the oboes d'amore and the continuo as equal partners.

In movement 5, Bach differentiates chorale and recitative differently from the second. The chorale lines are four-part settings, the recitatives are given to individual different singers in the sequence bass, tenor, alto, bass. The continuo unifies the movement by a constant independent regular motion in motifs based on triads.

In the last aria Bach invents a setting for strings that illustrates the instability of "frenzied reason" in syncopated rhythm, interrupted by chords on the repeated appeal "" (be silent). The drama of the aria rests only at the end of the middle section, when the words "" (they will be revived with solace) are given by a fermata and the marking adagio. The cantata is closed by two stanzas of the chorale in a four-part setting.

Recordings 

 The RIAS Bach Cantatas Project (1949–1952), Karl Ristenpart, RIAS Kammerchor, RIAS Kammerorchester, Ingrid Lorenzen, Helmut Krebs, Dietrich Fischer-Dieskau, Audite 1950
 Die Bach Kantate Vol. 44, Helmuth Rilling, Gächinger Kantorei, Bach-Collegium Stuttgart, Gabriele Schreckenbach, Kurt Equiluz, Wolfgang Schöne, Hänssler 1972
 Bach Cantatas Vol. 4 – Sundays after Trinity I, Karl Richter, Münchener Bach-Chor, Münchener Bach-Orchester. Julia Hamari, Peter Schreier, Dietrich Fischer-Dieskau, Archiv Produktion 1977
 J. S. Bach: Das Kantatenwerk · Complete Cantatas · Les Cantates, Folge / Vol. 41 – BWV 175-179, Nikolaus Harnoncourt, Tölzer Knabenchor, Concentus Musicus Wien, Panito Iconomou as soloist of the Tölzer Knabenchor, Kurt Equiluz, Robert Holl, Teldec 1988
 Bach Edition Vol. 11 – Cantatas Vol. 5, Pieter Jan Leusink, Holland Boys Choir, Netherlands Bach Collegium, Sytse Buwalda, Knut Schoch, Bas Ramselaar, Brilliant Classics 1999
 J. S. Bach: Complete Cantatas Vol. 14, Ton Koopman, Amsterdam Baroque Orchestra & Choir, Annette Markert, Christoph Prégardien, Klaus Mertens, Antoine Marchand 2000
 Bach Cantatas Vol. 5: Rendsburg/Braunschweig / For the 8th Sunday after Trinity / For the 10th Sunday after Trinity, John Eliot Gardiner, Monteverdi Choir, English Baroque Soloists, Robin Tyson, Christoph Genz, Brindley Sherratt, Soli Deo Gloria 2000
 J. S. Bach: Cantatas Vol. 23 – Cantatas from Leipzig 1724 – BWV 10, 93, 107, 178, Masaaki Suzuki, Bach Collegium Japan, Matthew White, Makoto Sakurada, Peter Kooy, BIS 2002
J. S. Bach: Cantatas for the Complete Liturgical Year Vol. 3: "Ich habe genug" – Cantatas BWV 82 · 102 · 178, Sigiswald Kuijken, La Petite Bande, Elisabeth Hermans, Petra Noskaiová, Christoph Genz, Jan van der Crabben, Accent 2008
J. S. Bach: Wo Gott der Herr nicht bei uns hält, Georg Christoph Biller, Thomanerchor, Gewandhausorchester, Susanne Krumbiegel, Martin Petzold, Matthias Weichert, Rondeau Production 2008

References

Sources 

 
 Wo Gott, der Herr, nicht bei uns hält BWV 178; BC A 112 / Chorale Cantata (8th Sunday after Trinity) Bach Digital
 Cantata BWV 178 Wo Gott der Herr nicht bei uns hält history, scoring, sources for text and music, translations to various languages, discography, discussion, Bach Cantatas Website
 BWV 178 Wo Gott der Herr nicht bei uns hält English translation, University of Vermont
 BWV 178 Wo Gott der Herr nicht bei uns hält text, scoring, University of Alberta
 Luke Dahn: BWV 178.7 bach-chorales.com

Church cantatas by Johann Sebastian Bach
Psalm-related compositions by Johann Sebastian Bach
1724 compositions
Chorale cantatas